Yunna may refer to:

 Yunna Morits (born 1937), Russian poet, poetry translator, and activist
 Ella Koon (born 1979), full name Ella Koon Yun-na, Hong Kong Cantopop singer and actress
 Yunna, a featured artist on the single "Makaroni" by Spankox
 Wael Yunna, also known as Wael Mikhael, journalist in Wael Mikhael incident

See also 
 Yunnan, Chinese province
 Younha (born Go Yun-ha, 1988), South Korean singer, written ユンナ in Japanese
 Yuna (disambiguation)
 Yuuna (disambiguation)